The 2013 FAI Women's Cup Final was the final match of the 2013 FAI Women's Cup, the national association football Cup of the Republic of Ireland. The match took place on 3 November 2013 at the Aviva Stadium in Dublin. Raheny United and Castlebar Celtic contested the match.

The match was shown live on RTÉ2 and RTÉ2 HD in Ireland and was refereed by Marie Ward, assisted by Deirdre Nolan and Olivia Syned with Natasha Valenti as Fourth Official. The Referee Observer was Victor Loughman.

Raheny United won the Cup to retain the trophy they won for the first time the previous year. Underdogs Castlebar Celtic equalised twice to force extra time but were unable to come back a third time after conceding an own goal.

Background
The two managers were already acquainted, as Raheny's Terry Eviston had previously been in charge of Athlone Town when Castlebar's Adrian Carberry had been a player at the League of Ireland club. 

Carberry was barred from the technical area at the Aviva Stadium because he was an employee of the Football Association of Ireland. His request for a one-off dispensation was refused, so he took his place in the stand and his assistant Maz Sweeney directed operations from pitch-side. 

All the Castlebar Celtic players wore the name Jeremy on the back of their shirts, as a mark of respect to their former manager Jeremy Dee whose untimely death occurred in November 2012.

As Cup holders, reigning Women's National League champions and undefeated League-leaders, Raheny United entered the match as strong favourites. Two weeks previously they had beaten Castlebar Celtic's comparatively youthful team 9–2 in a League fixture.

Castlebar Celtic were without Shauna Jackson due to an injured ankle. Deirdre Doherty had missed recent fixtures while attending college in England, but Castlebar retained her registration and she agreed to come back to play in the match. Seana Cooke had agreed a transfer from Raheny United to Durham in the week leading up to the match.

Match

Summary
As the match was played as a curtain raiser to the 2013 FAI Cup Final between Drogheda United and Sligo Rovers, it began with a "small crowd" of around 200 which expanded to a reported attendance of 17,573 in time for the men's final.

Raheny took control of possession in the early exchanges and forced Castlebar's 16-year-old goalkeeper Caoimhe O'Reilly into action. Raheny took the lead after 37 minutes when Ciara Grant hit a half volley over O'Reilly and into the net. 

Castlebar continued to yield the territorial advantage but tried to hit Raheny on the break, usually through their skilful playmaker Emma Hansberry. On 67 minutes Sarah Rowe made a foray up the right wing and found Hansberry, who played the ball inside for substitute Emma Mullin to score the equaliser.

On 84 minutes Raheny went back ahead when Caroline Thorpe was controversially adjudged to have been fouled by Castlebar's young goalkeeper, and scored the resultant penalty kick herself. Castlebar equalised again in the last minute of normal time, when another substitute Deirdre Doherty fired a powerful long-range shot past Niamh Reid Burke.  

The standard 15-minutes each-way of extra-time was unexpectedly abridged to ten minutes each-way. Five minutes into the additional period Castlebar's centre-back Kim Flood inadvertently headed Siobhán Killeen's cross past O'Reilly and into her own goal. The luckless Flood was later carried off with an injury, replaced by Rachel Kearns.

During the presentation of the trophy to victorious Raheny captain Becky Creagh, Sligo Rovers players intruded on the pitch to begin their warm up.

Experienced midfielder Caroline Thorpe was named Player of the Match by RTÉ summariser Susan Ronan. Thorpe later revealed that she had been bereaved by the death of her brother and was in the grip of anorexia nervosa at the time.

Details

References

External links
RTÉ's full match coverage on YouTube

FAI Women's Cup Final 2013
Final
FAI Women's Cup finals
November 2013 sports events in Europe